Death Jr. is a 2005 video game for the PlayStation Portable. The PSP iteration was the first PSP game shown publicly and advertised as a killer-app. It was released to a mixed reception and noted for numerous problems about the camera, gameplay and uninspiring graphics, but was praised for its Tim Burton-esque themes and quirky characters. Slightly better received was the comic book adaptation by Gary Whitta and Ted Naifeh, which includes two three-issue miniseries. The game was followed by Death Jr. II: Root of Evil in 2006 and Death Jr. and the Science Fair of Doom in 2007.

Death Jr. was conceived during experiments with the engine of the cancelled game Prime 8, a planned spin-off to the Spyro The Dragon series.

Plot
The game and comic book are about the teenage son of the Grim Reaper, named Death Jr. (DJ for short).  His father tried many times (all of them failed) to stop his son from creating chaos at every school he has been in. Now is DJ's last chance. If he creates chaos one more time, he'll be sent to military school. He meets new friends at this school: Pandora, a girl with Obsessive-Compulsive Disorder and a thing for locked boxes; Stigmartha, a girl who has holes in her hands and bleeds from them whenever she's nervous; Smith and Weston, conjoined twins who are very smart and conjoined at the head; the Seep, an armless, legless, foul-mouthed kid in a vat; and the Dead Guppy, a character who speaks for himself.

The friends go on a field trip to a museum, where they find a locked box that Pandora wants opened, so DJ opens it to impress her.  Unfortunately, all hell breaks loose and demons run amok. It's up to DJ to stop them and revert the town back to normal, all the while making sure Dad doesn't find out.

Gameplay
In the game, the player has a variety of guns ranging from pistols to a rocket launcher. The controls are simple. The player moves around with the analog nub and attacks people with the square and circle buttons. There is a lot of emphasis in the game on the combos which can be achieved by linking attacks to each other in rapid succession.

Reception 

The game received average or mixed reviews, as GameRankings gave it a score of 63.30% while Metacritic gave it a score of 61 out of 100.

See also 
 Death, Jr. and the Science Fair of Doom
 Death Jr. II: Root of Evil

References

External links 
 
 

2005 video games
Action video games
Hack and slash games
Konami franchises
Konami games
PlayStation Portable games
PlayStation Portable-only games
Video games about death
Video games developed in Canada